Peter Brabrook (8 November 1937 – 10 December 2016) was an English footballer who made nearly 500 appearances in the Football League playing for Chelsea, West Ham United and Orient, and was capped three times for the England national team. He played as a winger.

Career
Brabrook was born in Greenwich, London, and started his career at Ford United. He then moved on to Chelsea, making his debut during the 1954–55 season, during which the club won the league championship, though he only made three appearances. He established himself in the Chelsea first-team in the following years, making 271 appearances and scoring 57 goals in all competitions. Soon after Tommy Docherty took over as manager, Brabrook signed for West Ham United in 1962 for £35,000.

Alongside players such as Bobby Moore, Martin Peters and Geoff Hurst, Brabrook won the FA Cup and the Cup Winners' Cup with the club in consecutive seasons. He retired from playing after a stint with Orient and non-League Romford, and later returned to West Ham to take a role at their academy, helping to develop players such as Frank Lampard, Joe Cole and Michael Carrick.

He was capped three times for England, including a game against the USSR at the 1958 World Cup.

Brabrook died on 10 December 2016, aged 79.

Honours
West Ham United
FA Cup: 1963–64
FA Charity Shield: 1964

References

External links
 
 

1937 births
2016 deaths
Footballers from Greenwich
English footballers
England international footballers
England under-23 international footballers
Association football wingers
Chelsea F.C. players
West Ham United F.C. players
Leyton Orient F.C. players
Romford F.C. players
English Football League players
1958 FIFA World Cup players
English Football League representative players
Redbridge F.C. players
West Ham United F.C. non-playing staff
FA Cup Final players
Association football coaches